= 1931 Saint Lucian general election =

General elections were held in Saint Lucia in 1931.

== Background ==
In 1924 a partially elected Legislative Council of twelve members was established with nine nominated seats and three elected seats. Prior to the 1931 elections women were given the right to vote and run for office.

== Campaign ==
Louis McVane was the only candidate in Northern District. Western District was contested by H. E. Belmar and DuBoulay, who had a heated campaign.

== Results ==
All three MLCs elected in 1928 were re-elected; George Palmer in Eastern District, McVane in Northern District and Belmar in Western District.
