= 1928 Saint Lucian general election =

General elections were held in Saint Lucia in 1928. All three constituencies had only one candidate, resulting in all three being returned unopposed.

== Background ==
In 1924 a partially elected Legislative Council of 12 members was established with nine nominated seats and three elected seats. The first elections were held in 1925.

== Results ==
George Palmer was re-elected in Eastern District, Louis McVane in North District and H.E. Belmar in Western District.
