= 1925 Saint Lucian general election =

Election of 1925 in Saint Lucia

General elections were held in Saint Lucia on 9 March 1925. Only two of the three elected seats were contested, with two members elected unopposed.

== Background ==
The Wood Commission chaired by Lord Halifax had visited British islands in the Caribbean in 1922 with the mandate to "ascertain if the people were ready for some form of political development". A Saint Lucian delegation presented their case to the Commission, whilst the Representative Government Association was also established to campaign for political reform. The Association held a public meeting in Columbus Square where Louis McVane read out its manifesto, which he subsequently presented to Lord Halifax.

In 1924 Letters patent were issued making provisions for the establishment of a partially elected Legislative Council.

== Electoral system ==
The Legislative Council was to consist of a total of twelve members, three of whom would be elected, three appointed, and the remainder included the Colonial Secretary, the Attorney General, the Treasurer, the Registrar of the Royal Court, the Chief Medical Officer and the Inspector of Schools.

The three members were elected in separate constituencies; North, East and West.

== Aftermath ==
Thomas Westall (in the North constituency), George Palmer (in the East constituency) and Thomas Hull (in the West constituency) were elected to the Council, whilst George Barnard, William Degazon, and Gabriel LaFitte were all appointed. The new Council met for the first time on 1 May 1925.
